This Marriage Business is a 1938 American comedy film directed by Christy Cabanne from a screenplay by Gladys Atwater and J. Robert Bren, based on a story by Mel Riddle and Alex Rubin. The film stars Allan Lane, Jack Carson, Victor Moore, and Vicki Lester. Produced by RKO Radio Pictures, which also distributed the film, it was released on April 8, 1938.

Plot summary

Cast
 Victor Moore as Jud Parker
 Allan Lane as Bill Bennett
 Vickie Lester as Nancy Parker (as Vicki Lester)
 Cecil Kellaway as Police Chief Hardy
 Jack Carson as 'Candid' Perry
 Richard Lane as Joe Selby
 Kay Sutton as Bella Lawson
 Paul Guilfoyle as Frankie Spencer
 Vinton Hayworth as Attorney Lloyd Wilson (as Jack Arnold)
 Frank M. Thomas as Mayor Frisbee
 Leona Roberts as Mrs. Platt
 George Irving as Madden

References

External links
 
 
 
 

1938 comedy films
1938 films
American comedy films
RKO Pictures films
American black-and-white films
Films produced by Cliff Reid
Films directed by Christy Cabanne
1930s American films